Ankit Bathla (born 10 October 1988) is an Indian television actor known for his portrayal of Madhav in Beta Hi Chahiye, Dhruv Pandey in Thapki Pyar Ki and Akshay Khanna in Tu Sooraj Main Saanjh, Piyaji. He was last seen playing Rajat in Naagin: Bhagya Ka Zehreela Khel. He played the double role of Siddhanth Sinha and Advocate Vedant Sinha in And TV's show Ghar Ek Mandir - Kripa Agrasen Maharaj Ki.

Personal life
Ankit Bathla was born on 10 October 1988 to mother Mugdha Bathla and father Anil Kumar Bathla in New Delhi, India. He completed his schooling from St. Mark's Senior Secondary Public School, Meera Bagh, Delhi. He later completed his graduation in Economics (Hons) from Sri Guru Gobind Singh College of Commerce of Delhi University.

Career
Ankit Bathla began working as a trainer with American Express before moving into acting. His first television appearance was on DD National in Sammaan Ek Adhikaar where he played an anti-hero. Later he acted in Bhagonwali-Baante Apni Taqdeer, playing the pivotal character Abhigyan on Zee TV, followed by Mata Ki Chowki as Arjun on Sahara One, and Hamari Saass Leela as the youngest son, Ayush, of Leela Parekh (Apara Mehta) on Colors TV.

In 2010 he played the role of Gaurav in Hum on DD National opposite Mona Vasu. Later he acted in Haar Jeet (TV series) as Abhigyan on Imagine TV. In 2013, Ankit worked on the TV show Beta Hi Chahiye as Madhav on Big Magic opposite Garima Tiwari; it was the first daily soap opera launched on BIG Magic by Reliance Entertainment.
After Beta Hi Chahiye, Ankit played the role of Karan Khanna who was the love interest of Veera (Digangana Suryavanshi) in Ek Veer Ki Ardaas...Veera on Star Plus. In the fifth episode of Love by Chance (airing on Bindass) he played the role of Lieutenant colonel Kanishka Mehta.

In November 2014, Bathla joined the cast of the show Ajab Gajab Ghar Jamai (Red Dot Productions) on Big Magic playing the role of Krishna.

In March 2015, Bathla appeared in an episode of Red Dot Productions's show Halla Bol on Bindass. He appeared in Sony Entertainment Television's mythological show Sankatmochan Mahabali Hanuman which premiered on 4 May 2015.
Currently Ankit is part of serial Thapki Pyar Ki on Colors TV. In Thapki Pyar Ki Ankit essayed the lead role of Dhruv who is an owner of a news channel and makes serious faces.
In September 2016, Ankit hosted Benadryl Big Golden Voice Season 4 Finale in Mumbai.
In May 2017, he appeared in an Indonesian Series Cinta Di Pangkuan Himalaya on antv.
On 17 March 2018, he played in a web series Love, lust and confusion by VIU India starring Tara Alisha Berry

Commercial ads

Ankit has done big banner ads for Bharti Airtel and Maruti Suzuki Ritz.

Television

Filmography

See also

List of Indian film actors

References

1988 births
Living people
Indian male television actors
Indian male soap opera actors
Indian male models
Male actors from New Delhi
People from Delhi

External links